Chunghyeon-dong is a dong, neighbourhood of Seodaemun-gu in Seoul, South Korea.

See also 
 Administrative divisions of South Korea

References

External links 
 Seodaemun-gu Official site in English
 Map of Seodaemun-gu
  Seodaemun-gu Official website

Neighbourhoods of Seodaemun District